Hardin may refer to:

Places in the United States
 Hardin, Illinois, in Calhoun County
 Hardin County, Illinois
 Hardin, Iowa, in Clayton County
 Hardin County, Iowa
 Hardin, Kentucky, in Marshall County
 Hardin County, Kentucky
 Hardin, Missouri
 Hardin, Montana
 Hardin City, Nevada
 Hardin, Ohio, in Shelby County
 Hardin County, Ohio
Hardin County Airport
 Hardin County, Tennessee
 Hardin, Texas, in Liberty County
 Hardin County, Texas

Places in Lebanon
 Hardine, a village in Batroun District, North Lebanon Governorate, Lebanon

Other uses
 Hardin (surname), including a list of people with the name
 Salvor Hardin, a fictional character in the Foundation series created by Isaac Asimov
 Hardin, a fictional character in the Fire Emblem franchise
 Hardin Scott, one of the protagonists in the novel After
 Hardin College (disambiguation)

See also

 Harden (disambiguation)
 Hardin Township (disambiguation)
 Buddy Holly (Charles Hardin Holley, 1936–1959), American singer
 Hardin v. Boyd, an 1885 U.S. Supreme Court case